Robert D. Leeper (1891 – December 19, 1932) was a justice of the Idaho Supreme Court in 1932.

Born in Tacoma, Washington, he received his J.D. from the University of Idaho College of Law in 1913, and served in the United States Army in World War I. He was appointed to the Idaho Supreme Court by Governor C. Ben Ross, taking his seat on January 1, 1932, but died of pneumonia just under a year into his term.

References

Justices of the Idaho Supreme Court
1891 births
1932 deaths
People from Tacoma, Washington
United States Army personnel of World War I
Deaths from pneumonia in Idaho